Maroon Town may refer to:

 Maroon Town, Jamaica, a settlement
 Maroon Town, Sierra Leone, a district of Freetown